Adebayo Gbadebo (born 30 May 1974) is a Nigerian retired footballer and football manager, frequently known simply as Adebayo. He is the current head coach of Thai club Kanjanapat.

Early life and education

Gbadebo attended Ansar Ud Seen Primary School Odunfa at Ebute Metta in Lagos State and Ansar Ud Been Grammar School at Randle Avenue Surulere, Lagos State, for his Secondary School Certificate. He also attended Anwar Ul Islam College Agege, Lagos State, for his Advanced Level School Certificate. He attended the University of Ibadan, Oyo State, where he earned his B.Sc degree in sociology in 1990. While there, Gbadebo was elected Student Union Sports Secretary in 1989.

Player career 

In 1993, Gbadebo joined Stationery Stores F.C. During 1990-1993, Gbadebo was called to play for Nigeria National Team U-20 and U-23, From 1994 to 1998 he played for Al-Bourj FC and in 1998 moved to BEC Tero Sasana F.C. The following year, he went on loan to Mohun Bagan A.C., then back again to Thailand to lead BEC Tero Sasana F.C. to win the Thai Premier League in 2000-2001 and BEC Tero Sasana F.C. to the Asia Champions League quarter-final. In 2004, he moved to the Indonesian club PSPS Pekanbaru.

Managerial career 

Gbadebo is an "A" license coach (by AFC) is currently coaching Suphanburi F.C. in Thai League 1. He was head coach for Bangkok Christian International School Senior and Under 15 soccer teams from 2007 to 2009 at TISAC Championship, assistant coach for Thai Port FC in the Thailand F.A. Cup Champion in 2010, technical director and head coach of Suphanburi F.C. youth team in 2013, when it was runner up at the Thailand National Youth Championship in 2013. During the 2014 Thai Premier League season, MGbadebo oversaw the club as head coach for five premier league matches (won 4, drew 1) and Thai FA Cup 2nd round match away at Nakhon Pathom (qualified for quarter final).

Managerial statistics 

 A win or loss by the penalty shoot-out is regarded as the draw in time.

Personal life 
Gbadebo is married with three children.

Gbadebo was ordained as assistant pastor of The Redeemed Christian Church of God in 2006 and ordained as a full pastor in 2009 during the Convention theme "Hope Of Glory". He is the country co-ordinator of the church in Thailand.

References

1974 births
Living people
Nigerian footballers
Nigerian football managers
Association footballers not categorized by position